Jaesusaeng is a Korean term for high school students who decide to spend a year studying to re-take the College Scholastic Ability Test, hoping to get a higher score and enter the university of their choice. Attending university has a major impact on their future careers. The equivalent term in Japan is rōnin.

Social context 
Gaining entrance to the extremely competitive and prestigious SKY universities in Seoul requires that some students become jaesusaeng after an initial less-than-stellar performance on the national exam. Korea is "prepossessed by social status and reputation," and a SKY education is the main way to gain social status.

Generally, the public education system is not enough to prepare students for the exam, so most students attend after school lessons at various hagwon (cram schools). The fierce competition for enrollment at prestigious universities is called "entrance exam war".

Effects
The stress from constant study and limited social life as a student have contributed to an increase in suicide in South Korea; for children aged 10 to 19 years old, suicide is the second most common cause of death in the country.

Related term
When a student fails to earn an adequate score over 3 or more years, he may be derisively referred to as a jangsusaeng a play on words from the expression "Please live a long life" said to elders (장수 하세요). Beginning around 2010, the word "N susaeng" is in common use, wherein the Chinese character jang (長, meaning "long") is replaced with the Latin letter N, which represents the undefined number of times the student is taking the test.

See also
Bǔ kè
Rōnin
Hagwon
Education in South Korea
Cram school
Dek siw

References

Academic pressure in East Asian culture
Education in South Korea
Korean words and phrases
Neologisms
Students in South Korea
South Korean culture